Come Blow Your Horn is Neil Simon's first play, which premiered on Broadway in 1961 and had a London production in 1962 at the Prince of Wales Theatre. Simon rewrote the script more than two dozen times over several years, resulting in a hit premiere that allowed Simon to leave his full-time television writing career to write stage and film scripts.

Productions
Come Blow Your Horn opened on Broadway at the Brooks Atkinson Theatre on February 22, 1961 and closed on October 6, 1962 after 677 performances and one preview. The cast featured Hal March (Alan Baker), Arlene Golonka, Warren Berlinger (Buddy), Lou Jacobi (Mr. Baker) and Pert Kelton (Mrs. Baker). The director was Stanley Prager, with sets and lighting by Ralph Alswang. It was produced by Arthur Cantor. 

The play opened in the West End in 1962 at the Prince of Wales Theatre, starring Michael Crawford as Buddy, Bob Monkhouse and David Kossoff.

The play was revived at the Jewish Repertory Theater, New York City, running in December 1987.

In June 2005, Jacob Murray directed a production at the Royal Exchange, Manchester with Jamie Glover as Alan Baker, Andrew Langtree as Buddy Baker, Malcolm Rennie as Mr Baker and Amanda Boxer as Mrs Baker.

Plot overview
The play tells the story of a young man's decision to leave the home of his parents for the bachelor pad of his older brother who leads a swinging '60s lifestyle. Buddy is a 21-year-old virgin and his older brother Alan is a ladies' man. Alan lives in an apartment in the East Sixties, New York City.

As the play progresses, Alan discovers feelings for one of the many women with whom he is sleeping, and when she leaves him, he falls apart. This juxtaposes Alan's hunger for companionship with Buddy's metamorphosis into a ladies' man. The playwright points out the fundamental spiritual and emotional emptiness of the playboy lifestyle for which the younger sibling desperately yearns.

Characters
Alan Baker
Peggy Evans
Buddy Baker
Mr. (Father) Baker
Connie
Mrs. (Mother) Baker

Film adaptation
The play was made into a film in 1963, starring Frank Sinatra as Alan and Tony Bill as Buddy.

Inspiration
Simon modeled the on-stage parents on his mother and father.

Reception
Howard Taubman, in his review for The New York Times, wrote that the play was "smoothly plotted and deftly written...Mr. Simon has served up a multitude of sprightly lines. Best of all, he has provided some explosively hilarious moments rooted in character."

References

External links
 
 

1961 plays
Plays by Neil Simon
Broadway plays
1960s debut plays
Autobiographical plays
American plays adapted into films
Plays set in New York City